The Braid Burn is a burn or stream  in length that flows through south and east Edinburgh.

Course
The burn forms near Bonaly in the Pentland Hills south-west of the city, when the Bonaly and Howden burns that flow from the Pentlands meet. From there, it flows in a generally north-easterly direction, skirting the Braid Hills to the east and south, via the Braid Valley Park, the Hermitage of Braid, Blackford Glen, Cameron Toll and Inch Park. On reaching Peffermill it is joined by the Jordan Burn, and at Duddingston its name changes to the Figgate Burn. It flows on to enter the Firth of Forth at Portobello.

The burn rises quickly after rain, and can become very large when in spate. 80 per cent of the catchment area of the burn is in the lower urban section, the other portion being south of the Edinburgh City Bypass.

The burn flows through part of its course in a gorge cut by glacial meltwater that exposed a weakness in the rock. Prior to this, the burn took a more southerly course around Blackford Hill. The gorge also prevented the building of houses along parts of the course, so the burn flows for several miles through parkland.

Wildlife
The burn contains small trout and bullhead, and otters are occasionally seen in the burn.

Flood prevention
The burn has a history of flooding, and major events occurred on 3 January 1982, 28 May 1983, 3 November 1984, 6 October 1990, 7 October 1993, 26–27 April 2000, 7–8 November 2000, and in October 2002.

After the flooding in 2000, the City of Edinburgh Council elected to install a flood prevention scheme along much of the stream's length. Walls and embankments were constructed at points along the length of the burn, and new culverts and bridges were installed, and alterations to upstream reservoirs in the Pentland Hills were carried out. Parks and golf courses were modified to store water in the event of a flood.

The scheme is designed to withstand 1 in 200 year event, and provides protection to around 900 properties.

In Literature
The burn is mentioned in Muriel Spark's famous novel of Edinburgh, The Prime of Miss Jean Brodie, when Sandy and Miss Brodie meet after the war at the Braid Hills Hotel: 'They looked out of the wide windows at the little Braid Burn trickling through the fields and at the hills beyond, so austere from everlasting that they had never been capable of losing anything by the war.'

References

External links

 Braidburn Valley Park
 Water levels in the burn

Rivers of Edinburgh